DB Boulevard  was an Italian electronic music group, consisting of members, vocalist Moony (Monica Bragato), along with producers Alfred Azzetto, Diego Broggio and Mauro Ferrucci.

In 2002, their song "Point of View" peaked at number 1 on the Billboard Hot Dance Club Play chart in the US and at number 3 on the UK Singles Chart. It contains a re-recorded version of a song called "Heatwave" by French band Phoenix, which was released as a single in 1999. The video clip of the song featured a computer animated cardboard woman. The song was used by Sky Sports in their Speedway Grand Prix coverage. It was also used in Sex and the City's season five episode "Cover Girl". In Australia, the song was played frequently on the Seven Network idents.

Discography

Studio albums

Singles

See also
 List of artists who reached number one on the US Dance chart

References

External links
 Official site

Italian electronic music groups
Italian house music groups
Musical groups established in 2001
Musical groups disestablished in 2006